1001 Grams is a 2014 Norwegian drama film written and directed by Bent Hamer. It was selected as the Norwegian entry for the Best Foreign Language Film at the 87th Academy Awards, but was not nominated.

Cast
 Ane Dahl Torp as Marie, a scientist
 Laurent Stocker as Pi
 Hildegun Riise as Wenche
 Peter Hudson as Professor Winkler
 Didier Flamand as Gérard
 Emil Abossolo-Mbo as Observer
 Sabine Pakora as Observer
 Per Christian Ellefsen
 Magne-Håvard Brekke
 Stein Winge

See also
 List of submissions to the 87th Academy Awards for Best Foreign Language Film
 List of Norwegian submissions for the Academy Award for Best Foreign Language Film

References

External links
 

2014 films
2014 drama films
2014 multilingual films
2010s French-language films
2010s English-language films
Norwegian drama films
2010s Norwegian-language films
Films directed by Bent Hamer
Films scored by John Erik Kaada
Norwegian multilingual films